{{Infobox scientist
| honorific_prefix = 
| name = 
| honorific_suffix = 
| native_name = 
| native_name_lang = 
| image = 
| caption = 
| birth_name = Paul J. Black
| birth_date = 
| birth_place = 
| death_date = 
| death_place = 
| death_cause = 
| resting_place = 
| resting_place_coordinates = 
| other_names = 
| residence = 
| citizenship = 
| nationality = 
| fields = PhysicsEducation
| workplaces = University of BirminghamNuffield FoundationChelsea College of Science and TechnologyKing's College LondonStanford UniversityOECDOFQUAL
| patrons = 
| education =  
| thesis_title = 
| thesis_url = 
| thesis_year = 
| doctoral_advisor = 
| known_for = PhysicsAssessment for learning
| awards = Lawrence Bragg Medal and PrizeOBEHonorary Fellow of Institute of PhysicsHonorary Fellow of the University of Surrey The International Commission on Physics Education honoured Black with their annual medal award in 2000. In 2005 he received a Lifetime Achievement Award for Outstanding Contribution to Science Education, from The Association for Science Education, and a Lifetime Achievement Award from the US National Association for Research in Science Teaching. In 2009, Black won the International Society for Design and Development in Education Prize for Design in Education (The Eddie)
Lifetime Achievement Award.

Selected writings

 The Voigt profile of Mossbauer transmission spectra with M.J. Evans, March 2001, Journal of Physics, C Solid State Physics 3(10):2167,  
 Interference between nuclear resonant and Rayleigh-Thomson scattering from magnetized crystals of iron with D.E. Evans, March 2001, Journal of Physics, F Metal Physics 2(2):219,  
 Feedback is the best nourishment with Dylan Wiliam, TES, 4 October 2002
 Testing, motivation and learning with Patricia Broafoot, Richard Daugherty and John Gardner, University of Cambridge School of Education, January 2002
 Standards in Public Examinations with Dylan Wiliam, King’s College London Department of Education and Professional Studies,  January 2002
 Assessment for Learning: Putting It Into Practice with Christine Harrison, Claire Lee, Bethan Marshall and Dylan Wiliam, Open University Press, September 2003
 Assessment in science: A guide to professional development and classroom practice, July 2003, Science Education, 87(4):613-615,  
 Redefining Assessment? The First Ten Years of Assessment in Education with Patricia Broadfoot, March 2004, Assessment in Education Principles Policy and Practice, 11(1):7-26,  
 The reliability of assessments with Dylan Wiliam, Sage, January 2005, 
 The Formative Purpose: Assessment Must First Promote Learning with Dylan Wiliam, April 2005, Yearbook of the National Society for the Study of Education, 103(2):20 - 50, 
 Learning how to Learn and Assessment for Learning with Robert Mccormick, Mary James and David Pedder, June 2006, Research Papers in Education, 21(2), 
 School pupils’ beliefs about learning with Joanna Swann and Dylan Wiliam, June 2006, Research Papers in Education, 21(2):151-170, 
 Large-scale assessment systems: Design principles drawn from international comparisons 1 with Dylan Wiliam, April 2007, Measurement Interdisciplinary Research and Perspectives, 5(1):1-53, 
 Formative Assessment Issues Across the Curriculum: The Theory and the Practice, January 2009, TESOL Quarterly 43(3), 
 Reflections and new directions with Robert McCormick, August 2010, Assessment & Evaluation in Higher Education, 35(5):493-499, 
 Road Maps for Learning: A Guide to the Navigation of Learning Progressions with Mark Wilson and Shih-Ying Yao, April 2011, Measurement Interdisciplinary Research and Perspectives, 9(2):71-123, 
 EPMA Professionals—Servants or Masters?, January 2012, Measurement Interdisciplinary Research and Perspectives, 10(1-2):33-37, 
 Pedagogy in Theory and in Practice: Formative and Summative Assessments in Classrooms and in Systems, November 2013, 
 Formative assessment – an optimistic but incomplete vision, January 2015, Assessment in Education Principles Policy and Practice, 22(1), 
 Celebration of the past—challenge for the future, May 2016, Physics Education, 51(3):030103, 
 Assessment in Science Education, January 2017, In book: Science Education (pp.295-309), 
 Helping students to become capable learners, March 2018, European Journal of Education, 53(2),

References

British physicists
Professorships at King's College London 
Fellows of the Institute of Physics 
Academics of the University of Birmingham
Alumni of the University of Cambridge
Officers of the Order of the British Empire